The fifth season of Dynasty originally aired in the United States on ABC from September 26, 1984 through May 15, 1985. The series, created by Richard and Esther Shapiro and produced by Aaron Spelling, revolves around the Carringtons, a wealthy family residing in Denver, Colorado.

Season five stars John Forsythe as millionaire oil magnate Blake Carrington; Linda Evans as his wife Krystle; Jack Coleman as Blake and Alexis's earnest son Steven; Gordon Thomson as Blake and Alexis's eldest son Adam; John James as Blake's former son-in-law Jeff Colby; Pamela Bellwood as Steven's wife, Claudia; Heather Locklear as Krystle's niece and Steven's ex-wife Sammy Jo; Michael Nader as Alexis's husband Dex Dexter; Catherine Oxenberg as Blake and Alexis's youngest daughter, Amanda; Michael Praed as Amanda's fiancé Prince Michael of Moldavia; Diahann Carroll as Blake's half-sister Dominique Deveraux; Billy Dee Williams as Dominique's husband, Brady Lloyd; Rock Hudson as Sammy Jo's biological father, Daniel Reece; Ali MacGraw as photographer Lady Ashley Mitchell; and Joan Collins as Alexis Colby, Blake's ex-wife and the mother of Adam, Fallon, Steven, and Amanda. The season also introduced recast Emma Samms as Blake and Alexis's daughter Fallon.

Development
Driven by the new head writer and producer Camille Marchetta, who had devised the wildly successful "Who Shot J.R.?" scenario on Dallas five years earlier, Dynasty hit #1 in the fifth season. During the season, Dynasty attracted controversy when Rock Hudson's real-life HIV-positive status was revealed after a romantic storyline between his character Daniel Reece and Evans's Krystle. Hudson's scenes required him to kiss Evans and, as news that he had contracted AIDS broke, there was speculation Evans would be at risk. The event led to a Screen Actors Guild rule requiring the notification of performers in advance of any scenes that require open-mouth kissing.

Undoubtedly the most famous Dynasty cliffhanger is the so-called "Moldavian Massacre" which occurs in the May 15, 1985 fifth-season finale. Amanda and Prince Michael's royal wedding is interrupted by terrorists during a military coup in Moldavia, riddling the chapel with bullets and leaving all of the major characters lying seemingly lifeless. Esther Shapiro later said, "It was a fairy-tale terrorist attack. It was beautifully shot, like a Goya painting." It became the most talked-about episode of any TV series during the calendar year of 1985, with a viewership of 25.9 million. In 2011, Ken Tucker of Entertainment Weekly named it one of the seven "Unforgettable Cliff-Hangers" of prime time dramatic television.

Plot
In the story, Alexis is exonerated for Mark's murder and her secret daughter Amanda comes to Denver and discovers that Blake is her father. Steven has married Claudia but leaves her for another man, and Claudia starts an affair with Adam. The marriage of Blake and Krystle is in crisis after the birth of their daughter Krystina; Dominique struggles to be accepted as a Carrington, and loses her husband Brady Lloyd in the process; and Sammy Jo discovers she is the heiress to a huge fortune. At the end of the season, an amnesiac Fallon reappears while the rest of the family go to Europe for the wedding of Amanda and Prince Michael of Moldavia.

Cast

Main

 John Forsythe as Blake Carrington
 Linda Evans as Krystle Carrington
 John James as Jeff Colby 
 Pamela Bellwood as Claudia Blaisdel 
Gordon Thomson as Adam Carrington
Jack Coleman as Steven Carrington
Michael Nader as Dex Dexter
Heather Locklear as Sammy Jo Carrington
Catherine Oxenberg as Amanda Carrington
Billy Dee Williams as Brady Lloyd
Michael Praed as Prince Michael of Moldavia
Emma Samms as Fallon Carrington Colby
Ali MacGraw as Lady Ashley Mitchell
Rock Hudson as Daniel Reece
Diahann Carroll as Dominique Deveraux
Joan Collins as Alexis Carrington

Recurring

William Beckley as Gerard
William Campbell as Luke Fuller
Susan Scannell as Nicole Simpson
Virginia Hawkins as Jeanette Robbins
Richard Hatch as Dean Caldwell
Betty Harford as Hilda Gunnerson
Joel Fabiani as King Galen of Moldavia

Notable guest stars

Clive Revill as Warren Ballard
Kevin McCarthy as Billy Waite
Bradford Dillman as Hal Lombard
Juliet Mills as Rosalind Bedford
Bibi Besch as Dr. Veronica Miller
Kerry Armstrong as Elena, Duchess of Branagh
Peter Mark Richman as Andrew Laird
Paul Burke as Neal McVane
John Saxon as Rashid Ahmed
Hank Brandt as Morgan Hess
James Sutorious as Gordon Wales
Harry Andrews as Tom Carrington

Cast notes

Episodes

Reception
In season five, Dynasty was ranked #1 in the United States with a 25.0 Nielsen rating.

References

External links 
 

1984 American television seasons
1985 American television seasons
Dynasty (1981 TV series) seasons